Justin Hartwig (born November 21, 1978) is a former American football center who played in the National Football League (NFL). He was drafted by the Tennessee Titans in the sixth round of the 2002 NFL Draft. He played college football at Kansas.

Hartwig also played for the Carolina Panthers and Pittsburgh Steelers. With the Steelers, he won Super Bowl XLIII, beating the Arizona Cardinals.

Early years
Hartwig earned All-Conference and second-team All-State honors as a senior offensive tackle at Valley High School in West Des Moines, Iowa. He earned honorable mention All-Conference after leading his high school basketball team in rebounding. In track and field, he won the conference discus title in two consecutive years.

College career
Hartwig played college football for the University of Kansas where he was a three-year starter at right tackle who appeared in 38 games with 34 starts. He was named honorable mention All-Big 12 as a junior and earned second-team All-Big 12 honors as a senior captain. He was a communication studies major.

Professional career

Tennessee Titans
Hartwig was drafted in the 2002 NFL Draft by the Tennessee Titans. In his rookie season, he played in the final three regular season games, primarily on special teams. He was inactive for the previous 13 games. In 2003, he started every game at center for Titans and helped Steve McNair lead the league in passing while Eddie George recorded his seventh 1,000-yard rushing season. He was a member of offensive line ranked tied for sixth in the league in fewest sacks allowed with 25. The offense ranked fourth overall in the AFC (eighth in NFL). Hartwig won starting center job with four preseason starts after never playing center prior to training camp. He started 47 games in 3 years.

Carolina Panthers
Hartwig signed a free agent contract with the Carolina Panthers in 2006, starting one game before being placed on injured reserve with a groin injury. Hartwig entered the 2007 season as the starting center for the Panthers. However, he was released after the season to make room for second-year player Ryan Kalil.

Pittsburgh Steelers
On March 18, 2008, the Pittsburgh Steelers signed Hartwig to a two-year contract, worth approximately US$4 million. Hartwig earned the starting spot at center for the 2008 season.   He was also in the starting lineup for the Steelers victorious Super Bowl XLIII appearance against the Arizona Cardinals. During Super Bowl XLIII, Hartwig committed a near-disastrous holding penalty in the end zone, which resulted in a safety and negated a first down pass which could have sealed the game up. The Cardinals then scored to go up by 3 points, but on the ensuing drive the Steelers managed to get a touchdown and win the game by a final score of 27-23.

On September 5, 2010, Hartwig was released by the Steelers after being beaten out for the starting job by rookie Maurkice Pouncey.

References

External links

Carolina Panthers bio
Pittsburgh Steelers bio

1978 births
Living people
Sportspeople from Mankato, Minnesota
Players of American football from Minnesota
American football centers
American football offensive guards
Kansas Jayhawks football players
Tennessee Titans players
Carolina Panthers players
Pittsburgh Steelers players
People from West Des Moines, Iowa